Robert William "Bob" Mara (1940–2014) was an Australian professional rugby league footballer who played as a winger for Balmain and was the father of the late Gary Mara.

Playing career
Mara made his debut for Balmain in 1959 scoring 9 tries in his first season. Mara went on to play for Balmain in the 1964 and 1966 New South Wales Rugby League grand finals against St. George losing on both occasions.

In 1968, Mara moved to the newly admitted side Penrith Panthers where he played for two seasons before retiring at the end of 1969. After retirement, Mara was inducted into the Balmain Tigers hall of fame and is considered as one of the club's greatest wingers.

References

1940 births
2014 deaths
Balmain Tigers players
Penrith Panthers players
Australian rugby league players
Rugby league players from Sydney
Rugby league wingers